Jim Jeffery Ballantine (November 6, 1967 – January 2002) was an American ice hockey center.

Early life and education 
Ballantine was born in Union Lake, Michigan. He attended the University of Michigan, where he played on the Michigan Wolverines men's ice hockey team.

Career 
Ballantine started his professional career with the Columbus Chill in the ECHL. He also played for the Richmond Renegades (ECHL), Indianapolis Ice (IHL), and Dallas Freeze (CHL). 

Ballantine was the first player to wear a three-digit number in a professional sports game. He wore the number 101 to promote Columbus, Ohio radio station CD101. Ballantine was a regular on-air personality on the station. Ballantine formerly wore number 19, in a nod to longtime Detroit Red Wings captain Steve Yzerman.

Personal life 
Ballantine died in 2002 from Lou Gherig's Disease (ALS).

References

External links
 
 

1967 births
2002 deaths
American men's ice hockey centers
Sportspeople from Oakland County, Michigan
Ice hockey players from Michigan
Michigan Wolverines men's ice hockey players
Columbus Chill players
Richmond Renegades players
Indianapolis Ice players
Dallas Freeze players
20th-century American people